Sotka ("a hundred" in Slavic languages) may refer to:

 MR-UR-100 Sotka Soviet ballistic missile
 T-34 medium tank, nicknamed sotka in Finnish
 T-100 "Sotka", a Soviet heavy tank prototype considered while developing the Kliment Voroshilov tank
 Sukhoi T-4, a Soviet bomber aircraft
 An area (a metric unit of area, one hundredth of a hectare)